Prattsburg is an unincorporated community in Delaware Township, Ripley County, in the U.S. state of Indiana.

History
A post office was established at Prattsburg in 1849, and remained in operation until it was discontinued in 1857. A member of the local Pratt family was postmaster, giving the community its name.

Geography

References

Unincorporated communities in Ripley County, Indiana
Unincorporated communities in Indiana
1849 establishments in Indiana